Matthew Anthony Willis (born April 13, 1984) is a former American football wide receiver in the National Football League (NFL). He was signed by the Baltimore Ravens as an undrafted free agent in 2007. He played college football at UCLA.

Early years
Willis attended Servite High School in California.

College career
Willis played college football at UCLA and during his career there, he made 21 appearances with 24 receptions for 248 yards and three touchdowns. He majored in sociology.

Professional career

Baltimore Ravens
Willis was signed by the Baltimore Ravens as an undrafted rookie free agent on May 4, 2007. In his rookie year, he played in five games making one reception for 11 yards, he also spent some time on defense making one tackle. He was released from the team's practice squad on September 17, 2008 to make room for defensive tackle J'Vonne Parker.

Denver Broncos
Willis was signed to the practice squad of the Denver Broncos on December 23, 2008 and remained there through the end of the season.

The following year, Willis was waived during final cuts on September 5 and re-signed to the team's practice squad. He was promoted to the active roster on January 1, 2010 after offensive tackle Herb Taylor was waived.

On October 17, 2010, in a game against the New York Jets, Willis suffered a broken foot, and was placed on the season-ending Injured Reserve.

Following the 2011 season, Willis became a restricted free agent, but was re-signed on April 16, 2012.

Detroit Lions
He was signed by the Detroit Lions on June 4, 2013, following the release of WR Lance Long. He was released by the Lions on August 31, 2013.

Other activities
Shortly after the NFL lockout, Willis participated as a contestant on G4's American Ninja Warrior. Willis succeeded in the first round competition but was too slow in completing it and was eliminated before he could go to the semi-finals.

References

External links
Denver Broncos bio
UCLA Bruins bio
 Olympic Academy Football

1984 births
Living people
Players of American football from Dallas
American football wide receivers
UCLA Bruins football players
Baltimore Ravens players
Denver Broncos players
Detroit Lions players
American Ninja Warrior contestants